The Roman Catholic Diocese of Geita is a diocese located in Geita in the Ecclesiastical province of Mwanza in Tanzania.

History
 November 8, 1984: Established as Diocese of Geita from the Diocese of Mwanza

Leadership
 Bishops of Geita (Roman rite)
 Bishop Aloysius Balina (November 8, 1984 – August 8, 1997), appointed Bishop of Shinyanga
 Bishop Damian Dalu (April 14, 2000 - March 14, 2014), appointed Archbishop of Songea
 Bishop Flavian Kassala (April 28, 2016 – Present)

See also
Roman Catholicism in Tanzania

Sources
 GCatholic.org
 Catholic Hierarchy

Geita
Christian organizations established in 1984
Roman Catholic dioceses and prelatures established in the 20th century
Geita, Roman Catholic Diocese of
1984 establishments in Tanzania